Founded in 1983, the West Adams Heritage Association (WAHA) is an historic preservation organization in Los Angeles, California that is focused on the preservation of the Historic West Adams section of the city.

As stated on their website: "West Adams is located just south and west of Downtown and contains the city's largest concentration of Victorian and Craftsman homes, five of the city's Los Angeles Historic Preservation Overlay Zones, and a concentration of Los Angeles Historic-Cultural Monuments."

The organization is known for sponsoring neighborhood tours as well as speaking out about preservation issues affecting West Adams.

References

External links
 

Non-profit organizations based in Los Angeles
Historic preservation organizations in the United States
Heritage organizations
Architectural history
Buildings and structures in Los Angeles
1983 establishments in California
Organizations established in 1983